Los Reyes may refer to:

Places in Mexico

 Los Reyes, Michoacán
 Los Reyes Acaquilpan, La Paz, State of Mexico
 Los Reyes, Veracruz
 Los Reyes metro station, a station on the Mexico City Metro

Other uses

 Los Reyes (TV series), a serial drama
 Gipsy Kings, a musical group, formerly known as Los Reyes

See also
 De los Reyes, a surname
 Reyes (disambiguation)